This is a list of properties and districts in Gwinnett County, Georgia that are listed on the National Register of Historic Places (NRHP).

Current listings

|}

Former listings

|}

See also

National Register of Historic Places listings in Georgia (U.S. state)
List of National Historic Landmarks in Georgia (U.S. state)

References

Gwinnett
Buildings and structures in Gwinnett County, Georgia